2156 Kate is a highly elongated background asteroid from the inner regions of the asteroid belt. The asteroid was discovered on 23 September 1917, by Soviet–Russian astronomer Sergey Belyavsky at the Simeiz Observatory on the Crimean peninsula. It was named for Kate Kristensen, wife of astronomer L. K. Kristensen.

Orbit and classification 

Kate orbits the Sun in the inner main-belt at a distance of 1.8–2.7 AU once every 3 years and 4 months (1,226 days). Its orbit has an eccentricity of 0.20 and an inclination of 5° with respect to the ecliptic. As no precoveries were taken, and no prior identifications were made, the asteroid's observation arc begins with its official discovery observation at Simeiz in 1917.

Naming 

This minor planet was named after Kate Kristensen, wife of astronomer L. K. Kristensen, who was involved in the body's orbit computation. The official naming citation was published by the Minor Planet Center on 1 April 1980.

Physical characteristics 

In the Tholen classification, Kate is a common S-type asteroid. It has also been characterized as a rare A-type asteroid by Pan-STARRS large photometric survey.

Rotation period 

A large number of rotational lightcurves were obtained from photometric observations. They gave a well-defined rotation period of 5.620 to 5.623 hours with a brightness variation between 0.5 and 0.9 magnitude.

Diameter and albedo 

According to the survey carried out by the NEOWISE mission of NASA's space-based Wide-field Infrared Survey Explorer, Kate measures 8.131 kilometers in diameter and its surface has an albedo of 0.189 and 0.2242, respectively, while the Collaborative Asteroid Lightcurve Link assumes a standard albedo for stony asteroids of 0.20 and calculates a diameter of 8.61 kilometers with an absolute magnitude of 12.69.

Notes

References

External links 
 Lightcurve Database Query (LCDB), at www.minorplanet.info
 Dictionary of Minor Planet Names, Google books
 Asteroids and comets rotation curves, CdR – Geneva Observatory, Raoul Behrend
 Discovery Circumstances: Numbered Minor Planets (1)-(5000) – Minor Planet Center
 
 

002156
Discoveries by Sergei Belyavsky
Named minor planets
002156
19170923